The Fontaine de Vaucluse is a karst spring in the commune of Fontaine-de-Vaucluse, France. The spring is the prime example in hydrogeology of a "Vaucluse spring". It is the source of the Sorgue.

Geography

Location
The Fontaine de Vaucluse is in the commune of Fontaine-de-Vaucluse in the department of Vaucluse. The commune was formerly called "Vaucluse", but being in a department with the same name caused confusion, so the commune was renamed "Fontaine-de-Vaucluse", after the spring.

Origin of the name
The village in which the spring is located was called "Vallis Clausa" ("closed valley") in Latin because of its topographical position. This in time became "Vaucluse", from which the spring takes its name. The name in the Provençal dialect is "Fònt de Vauclusa", the spring of the closed valley.  The word font has two meanings in Provençal, "fountain" and "spring". Here it designates a spring and not a fountain.

Geology 

The Fontaine de Vaucluse was formed after the Messinian salinity crisis, during the latter part of the Messinian age of the Miocene epoch, from 5.96 to 5.33 Ma (million years ago), which caused the depth of the exsurgence.

Above the spring there is a -high limestone cliff with innumerable breaks and faults. This acts as a reservoir, a karst aquifer, in which the water circulates along the discontinuities until it meets a barrier of limestone and clay.

The spring, which feeds the River Sorgue, is the only exit point of a  underground basin, which captures waters from Mont Ventoux, the Vaucluse Mountains, the Albion Plateau(fr) and the Lure Mountain(fr).

History 

In antiquity the site was a place of ritual offerings. During various dives, particularly in 1998, the members of the Fontaine-de-Vaucluse Speleological Society (SSFV), were intrigued by the presence of many coins. Prospecting dives were made by SSFV speleologists under the direction of the Department of Underwater and Underwater Archaeological Research (DRASSMfr). A year later, during a new exploration campaign, speleologists retrieved 400 pieces of great historical value. In 2003 a new archaeological site allowed other discoveries. 1,600 pieces and objects have been recovered, dating from the 1st century BC to the middle of the 5th century AD.

Legend

Legend of the Coulobre 

A legend tells that Saint Veranus, bishop of Cavaillon, rid the Sorgue of a horrible Drac, a devil or dragon, the Coulobre(fr). The Coulobre, whose name could be derived from the Latin word coluber (snake), was a winged creature who lived in the Fontaine de Vaucluse. According to legend, she coupled with dragons who then abandoned her, forcing her to raise on her own the small black salamanders to which she gave birth. She was desperate for a new husband and a father for her children but her ugliness repulsed all suitors.

According to Albert Dauzat and Charles Rostaing, the Drac is a Ligurian divinity of tumultuous waters and the Coulobre owes its name to two Celto-Ligurian(fr) roots: Kal (stone) and Briga (hill). This is the cliff overlooking the spring which still holds the Vache d'Or, the site of an ancient pastoral religion celebrating the strength and form of water and stone.

On the trail, we can see the Traou dou Couloubre, symbol of the fight of Saint Veranus against the ancient religions.

Legend of the nymph 

This legend recounts the story of a minstrel, Basil, who fell asleep on the way to the spring and saw a nymph appear. She led him to the edge of the spring, which opened to let them descend to a meadow strewn with supernatural flowers. The nymph showed seven diamonds to the minstrel. By lifting one of them, she made a powerful jet of water gush out. "Here," she said, "is the secret of the spring of which I am the guardian. To make it swell I remove the diamonds. With the seventh the water reaches the fig tree, which drinks only once a year." She disappeared while waking Basil.

Exploration and study 

It was then necessary to wait for the arrival of the scuba diving suit in 1946 when Jacques Cousteau reached , then  nine years later. 
This is the limit of dives with air. In 1981 Claude Touloumdjian reached  with an oxygen-helium mixture. Finally, in 1983, Jochen Hasenmayer reached . To go even deeper and touch the bottom it would be necessary to use robots.

In 1985 the Modexa 350 Mission removed the mystery about the depth of the system. In 2014 a virtual tour was created by the photographer Christoph Gerigk in collaboration with the Speleological Society of Fontaine de Vaucluse (SSFV) from 360° spherical panoramic views.

Today, the joint efforts of geologists, hydrogeologists, hydrochemists and speleologists have made it possible to gain a better understanding of the functioning of this karst spring.
Its catchment receives waters from Mont Ventoux, the Vaucluse Mountains, the Albion Plateau and Lure Mountain, but it excludes Bluye Mountain in the north, as well as the Luberon massif and the Apt syncline in the south.

This system of chasms and cavities, which riddles the Albion Plateau, is one of the effects of karstification.

It is the largest spring in France by volume of water released, and ranks fifth among the world's largest springs.

Notes

Sources

 

 

Karst springs
Geography of Provence-Alpes-Côte d'Azur
Geography of Vaucluse